Cats That Look Like Hitler is a satirical website featuring photographs of cats resembling Adolf Hitler, dictator of Germany from 1933 to 1945. Most of the cats are piebald, with a large black splotch underneath its nose, much like the dictator's toothbrush moustache, and other features that suggest a typically stern expression. Some have diagonal black patches on their heads resembling Hitler's fringe. The site was founded by Koos Plegt and Paul Neve in 2006 and became widely known after being featured on several television programmes across Europe and Australia. The site is now run only by Neve; as of February 2013 he had approved photographs of over 7,500 cats. The site is seemingly no longer maintained, as the webpage has not been updated since April 2014.

In popular culture

Stephen Colbert mentioned the site in his The Colbert Report in July 2010. The site was commonly referenced in the now defunct Australian gaming magazine Total Gamer and has become well known in New Zealand since it was mentioned on the Edge Nightshow by Brad Wattson that his cat 'Piggles' was the No. 1 "" (kitty Hitler) in the world. The site was also mentioned fleetingly in The Social Network.

Cats are a popular staple of internet culture, and Cats That Look Like Hitler can be considered an offshoot of a broader cultural fascination with cats on the internet. In 2011, The Daily Telegraph reported on a "" which was unable to find adoption due to its facial resemblance to the dictator.

Writer for The Times, Ben Machell, has interviewed the owners of sensational cats such as those on the site and has come up with various possible explanations for the creation and popularity of cats on the Internet, including Cats That Look Like Hitler. Machell mentions the cat's mysterious nature and personality as a perfect target for projecting personality and emotion on, and recalls the worship of cats by the ancient Egyptians.

See also

Cats and the Internet
Hitler teapot
Internet meme
List of Internet phenomena
Lolcat
Maus
Piebaldism in animals

References

External links

 

British comedy websites
Internet properties established in 2006
Cats in popular culture
Animal websites
Internet memes about cats
Cultural depictions of Adolf Hitler
Disturbances of pigmentation